Haplogroup K2b1 may refer to:

 Haplogroup K2b1 (Y-DNA)
 Haplogroup K2b1 (mtDNA), a rare subclade of Haplogroup K (mtDNA)